Nashoba Valley Medical Center is a 40 bed community hospital located in Ayer, Massachusetts. In 1994, Deaconess Hospital of Boston purchased what was then called Nashoba Community Hospital. The hospital was purchased by Essent Healthcare in 2001, and then subsequently sold to Steward Health Care System in 2011.

References

1964 establishments in Massachusetts
Hospitals in Middlesex County, Massachusetts
Ayer, Massachusetts